Robert Franklin Jones (June 25, 1907 – June 22, 1968) was a Republican member of the U.S. House of Representatives from Ohio for four terms from 1939 to 1947.

Biography 
Robert F. Jones was born in Cairo, Ohio.  He graduated from the Lima Central High School in Lima, Ohio, in 1924, and in 1929 from Ohio Northern University in Ada, Ohio, with a law degree.  He was admitted to the bar the same year and commenced practice in Lima.  He served as prosecuting attorney of Allen County, Ohio, from 1935 to 1939.

Jones was elected in 1938 as a Republican to the Seventy-sixth and to the four succeeding Congresses.  Jones was against isolationism and campaigned in favor of helping Britain throughout 1940.  In between July 25 of 1940 when France surrendered, and June 22 of 1941 when the Nazis invaded the Soviet Union, Britain was effectively alone.  During this time Jones, as well as his fellow Ohio congressmen Charles H. Elston and William E. Hess campaigned heavily in favor of giving Britain any aid we could.  Jones explicitly advocated entering the war on the British side throughout this time period. He served until his resignation on September 2, 1947. His appointment to the Federal Communications Commission (FCC) by President Harry S. Truman was confirmed by the Senate, and he served as FCC commissioner from  September 5, 1947, until his resignation on September 19, 1952.

Death
He resumed the practice of law in Washington, D.C., and died in Olney, Maryland, on June 22, 1968.  Interment in Lima Memorial Park Cemetery in Lima, Ohio.

References

Sources

The Political Graveyard

1907 births
1968 deaths
Ohio lawyers
People from Allen County, Ohio
Claude W. Pettit College of Law alumni
County district attorneys in Ohio
Members of the Federal Communications Commission
20th-century American politicians
Truman administration personnel
Republican Party members of the United States House of Representatives from Ohio